Manyanda is a village and a union council of Kallar Syedan Tehsil in Rawalpindi District Punjab, Pakistan. Manyanda Coms under Choha Khalsa Circle Union Councils Manyanda was under NA-50, National Assembly and PP-2, Punjab Assembly. After (Delimitation 2018) Nala Musalmana came under NA-58, National Assembly and PP-7, Punjab Assembly.

Geography

Kallar Syedan, the capital city, is a main shopping center for the people. The countryside surrounding the town is typical of Potohar Plateau landscape. It is surrounded by several smaller towns along with the main towns: ChowkPindori, Choha Khalsa, Doberan Kallan, Kanoha and Sir Suba Shah. The fertile land of the Union Council Manyanda region grows crops such as wheat, corn and peanuts.

Language
 Pothwari language: 100%

Schools in Manyanda 
 Government Boys High School SIR SUBA SHAH, MANIANDA, KALLAR SYEDAN
Government Boys Elementary School Khad, UC Manianda, Kallar Syedan

References

External links 
https://www.politicpk.com/rawalpindi-district-profile-uc-list-mna-mpa-seats-%D8%B1%D8%A7%D9%88%D9%84%D9%BE%D9%86%DA%88%DB%8C-%D8%B6%D9%84%D8%B9-%DA%A9%DB%8C-%DB%8C%D9%88%D9%86%DB%8C%D9%86-%DA%A9%D9%88%D9%86%D8%B3%D9%84%D8%B2/ UC25 Manyanda
 https://www.facebook.com/pg/PTI.Tehsil.Kallar.Syedan/photos/?tab=album&album_id=1514795995490536
 https://www.ecp.gov.pk/admin/ImgHandler.ashx?PressId=43801&type=PDF

Union councils of Kallar Syedan Tehsil
Populated places in Kallar Syedan Tehsil
Villages in Kallar Syedan Tehsil